Johan Persson (born February 26, 1990) is a Swedish professional ice hockey player. He is currently playing for Mora IK  of the Swedish HockeyAllsvenskan.

Persson made his Swedish Hockey League debut playing with Färjestad BK during the 2015–16 SHL season.

References

External links

1990 births
Living people
Färjestad BK players
Mora IK players
Nybro Vikings players
People from Östersund
Swedish ice hockey forwards
Timrå IK players
Sportspeople from Jämtland County